SM U-8 was one of the 329 submarines serving in the Imperial German Navy in World War I.

Service history
U-8 was engaged in the naval warfare and took part in the First Battle of the Atlantic.

Fate
In June 2015 the submarine's propeller, which had been illegally removed from the wreck, was recovered and presented to the German Navy.  It will be exhibited at the Laboe Naval Memorial near Kiel. In July 2016 the wreck of U-8 was officially designated as a protected site. The wreck is a Protected Wreck managed by Historic England.

Summary of raiding history

References

Bibliography

External links 

 'U-8 Off South Varne Buoy, English Channel: Undesignated Site Assessment'
 Historic England project to research First World War Submarines 
 

World War I submarines of Germany
1911 ships
Ships built in Kiel
U-boats commissioned in 1911
U-boats sunk by British warships
World War I shipwrecks in the English Channel
Type U 5 submarines
U-boats scuttled in 1915